The Mario media franchise extends out of video games into non-game media. Mario and themes related to the franchise have appeared in television shows, anime, films, comics and manga, merchandise, and musical performance.

Television 

Saturday Supercade is an animated television series produced for Saturday mornings by Ruby-Spears Productions. It ran for two seasons on CBS, beginning in 1983. Each episode comprised several shorter segments featuring video game characters from the Golden Age of Arcade Games. Donkey Kong, Mario and Pauline (from the Donkey Kong arcade game) were featured in the show.

The Super Mario Bros. Super Show! is the first American TV series based on the Mario NES games. It was broadcast in syndication from September 4 to December 1, 1989. Based on Super Mario Bros. and Super Mario Bros. 2. The show was produced by DIC Entertainment and was distributed for syndicated television by Viacom Enterprises (full rights have since reverted to DiC through Nintendo).

King Koopa's Kool Kartoons is a live action children's television show broadcast in Southern California during the holiday season of 1989/1990. The show starred King Koopa (also known as Bowser), the main antagonist of the Mario series. The 30-minute program was originally broadcast during the after-school afternoon time-slots on Los Angeles-based KTTV Fox 11.

The Adventures of Super Mario Bros. 3 is the second TV series based on the Mario NES games. It aired on NBC from September 8 to December 1, 1990. Based on the Super Mario Bros. 3 video game, the cartoon shows Mario, Luigi, Princess Toadstool and Toad fighting against Bowser and his Koopalings, who went by different names on the show. Like the previous Mario cartoon series, the animation was done by Sei Young Animation Co. Ltd, however this show was co-produced by Reteitalia S.P.A., hence the slight differences in character design.  It was part of a 1 hour block with Captain N's second season, structured such that 2 episodes of Mario 3 would bookend the longer Captain N episode that made the "meat" of the sandwich.

The Super Mario Challenge is a game show which aired on The Children's Channel. It ran from 1990 to 1991 and aired at 4:30 p.m. every weekday. The presenter, John Lenahan, was a lookalike of Mario, and dressed in his clothes. Two guest players had to do tasks, all of which involved playing the Mario video games Super Mario Bros., Super Mario Bros. 2 and, after its release in 1991, Super Mario Bros. 3. Rounds included challenges to see which player could complete a level in the fastest time and who could collect the most gold coins on a certain level.

Super Mario World is an animated television series based on the SNES video game of the same name. It is the third and currently last Saturday morning cartoon based on the Mario series. The show was originally aired on Saturday mornings on NBC in the 1991–92 season. It was featured in a half-hour time slot with a shortened version of Captain N: The Game Master. Episodes of Super Mario World were later shown as part of the syndication package Captain N and the Video Game Masters. Afterwards, the series was split from Captain N altogether and shown in time-compressed reruns on Mario All-Stars.

Mario Ice Capades is a television special featuring a Mario-themed Ice Capades skating show, broadcast on ABC on December 28, 1989. It starred Christopher Hewett as Bowser. Jason Bateman and Alyssa Milano also appeared in the special.

Films 
Bowser and the Super Mushroom appeared in the 2012 Disney computer-animated film Wreck-It Ralph; Mario is mentioned by Felix but not seen in the film. Mario's original arcade game appearance in Donkey Kong makes a cameo in the 2015 science fiction action comedy film Pixels.

Super Mario Bros.: The Great Mission to Rescue Princess Peach! (1986) 

Super Mario Bros.: The Great Mission to Rescue Princess Peach! is a 1986 anime film based on the Super Mario Bros. video game. Directed by Masami Hata and produced by Masakatsu Suzuki and Tsunemasa Hatano, the plot centers on Mario and Luigi, who go on a quest to save Princess Peach from Bowser. It is notable for being the first film based on a video game, predating the live-action Super Mario Bros. film by seven years.

Super Mario Bros. (1993) 

Super Mario Bros. is a 1993 American science-fiction comedy adventure fantasy film based on the Japanese video game series of the same name by Nintendo and distributed by The Walt Disney Studios through Hollywood Pictures, thus becoming one of several rare occasions where Disney and Nintendo have collaborated. The film was directed by Rocky Morton and Annabel Jankel, written by Parker Bennett, Terry Runté and Ed Solomon, and stars Bob Hoskins, John Leguizamo, Dennis Hopper, Samantha Mathis, Fisher Stevens, Fiona Shaw and Richard Edson. The story revolves around the titular Mario brothers, as they find a parallel universe, ruled by the ruthless dictator King Koopa, who seeks to merge the two dimensions so that he can rule both worlds, leaving it up to Mario and Luigi to join forces with Princess Daisy, the daughter of the world's displaced King, to stop Koopa.

Super Mario Bros. was shot in both New York City and North Carolina on a budget of $48 million. The film was released on May 28, 1993, in the United States and was unsuccessful both critically and commercially, receiving criticism for its storyline, characters, dialogue and unfaithfulness to the games. Bob Hoskins later stated in an interview in 2007 that the film was "the worst thing I ever did". However, the film was nominated for two Saturn Awards (one for Best Costume, the other for Best Make-up).

Years later, however, commentators called it a cult film, and has spawned a fan-made website, a fan-made sequel comic, and even a Blu-ray release in the United Kingdom.

The Super Mario Bros. Movie (2023) 

The Super Mario Bros. Movie is an upcoming computer animated film adaptation of the franchise, produced by Illumination and Nintendo. It is co-produced by Nintendo fellow and series' creator Shigeru Miyamoto and Illumination founder and CEO Chris Meledandri. The film features the voices of Chris Pratt as Mario, Anya Taylor-Joy as Peach, Charlie Day as Luigi, Jack Black as Bowser, Keegan-Michael Key as Toad, Seth Rogen as Donkey Kong, Kevin Michael Richardson as Kamek, and Fred Armisen as Cranky Kong; longtime Mario voice actor Charles Martinet will feature in a series of cameos. In January 2020, Nintendo's President Shuntaro Furukawa stated that the film is "moving along smoothly" with the film aiming for release in 2023. Furukawa stated that Nintendo would own the rights to the film, and both Nintendo and Universal would fund the production of the film. Meledandri called the film a "priority" for the Illumination animation studio.

Anime 

Amada Anime Series: Super Mario Bros. is a series of three direct-to-video OVAs produced by Studio Junio, licensed by Nintendo, and released on VHS tapes on August 3, 1989, exclusively in Japan. The plot of the episodes involve characters from the Mario franchise in the stories of three fairy tales: Momotarō, Issun-bōshi and Snow White. Its cast includes Miyako Endō (Princess Peach, Kinopio, Morton Koopa Jr., Wendy O. Koopa), Tōru Furuya (Mario), Masaharu Satō (Koopa, Larry Koopa, Iggy Koopa), Naoki Tatsuta (Luigi, Ludwig von Koopa, Roy Koopa, Lemmy Koopa), and Toshiko Sawada (narration).

The openings for each video used a soundtrack cue from On Golden Pond, namely "New Hampshire Hornpipe".

Mario Kirby Masterpiece Video is an 18-minute educational video released by HAL Laboratory in 1995 on VHS exclusively in Japan. The purpose of the video is to teach kanji to children by featuring two adventures starring Mario and Kirby separately, with still pictures narrated over by Mayumi Tanaka and kanji transcriptions.

Super Mario's Fire Brigade is a 1989 short fire safety public safety announcement video animated by Toei Animation and J.C.Staff, directed by Tatsuyuki Nagai and starring Toru Furuya as Mario, Yoku Shioya as Luigi, Saori Sugimoto as Kaoru, Yumi Tōma as Tatsuya, Chieko Saitō as Kaoru's Mom, and Daisuke Gori as Kaoru's Dad. There was also another video produced about traffic safety, titled Super Mario Traffic Safety.

Super Mario World: Mario & Yoshi's Adventure Land,  is a 28-minute interactive video anime based on Super Mario World released for Bandai's Terebikko system. The Terebikko allowed viewers to interact with the anime using a telephone-shaped microphone to answer multiple choice questions, such as what will hatch from Yoshi's egg. The cast includes Tōru Furuya as Mario, Yū Mizushima as Luigi, Yuriko Yamamoto as Peach, Chika Sakamoto as Yoshi and Takeshi Watabe as Bowser.

Comics

Super Mario-kun 

Super Mario-kun  is a Japanese kodomo manga series written and illustrated by Yukio Sawada (沢田 ユキオ Sawada Yukio) and serialized in the monthly manga anthology CoroCoro Comic. Individual chapters are collected into tankōbon volumes by Shogakukan, who released the first volume on July 27, 1991, and have released 56 volumes. The series has only been licensed in Japan and France, published by Soleil Manga. It follows Mario and his friends through the plot lines of many Mario video games, starting in Super Mario World and reaching as far as Super Mario Odyssey. Courses created by Sawada for Super Mario Maker were released on November 6, 2015, with a Super Mario-kun costume unlocked for players who clear them.

Viz Media  released the first English-language publication of CoroCoro's manga series in December 2020 under the title Super Mario Bros. Manga Mania.

There is another manga series which ran for five volumes with exactly the same title, written and drawn by Hiroshi Takase (嵩瀬ひろし), also published by Shogakukan but serialized in Pikkapika Comics. Because of the identical titles, Sawada's and Takase's series are easily confused. There is a third manga series with the same title, written and drawn by Kazuki Motoyama from 1988 to 1998.

Nintendo Comics System

The Nintendo Comics System was a series of comic books published by Valiant Comics in 1990 and 1991. It was part of a licensing deal with Nintendo, featuring characters from their video games and the cartoons based on them.

Super Mario Adventures

Super Mario Adventures is an anthology of comics that ran in Nintendo Power throughout 1992, featuring the characters from Nintendo's Mario series and based loosely on Super Mario World. The series was also serialized in CoroCoro Comic in 1993. Charlie Nozawa, the artist who created the comics, is also known by the pen name Tamakichi Sakura. Kentaro Takekuma was responsible for the story, which follows Mario and Luigi as they attempt to rescue Princess Peach after she is abducted by Bowser with intent to marry her.

Gamebooks

Nintendo Gamebooks were gamebooks released in two series, Nintendo Adventure Books and You Decide on the Adventure, and based on video games created by Nintendo.

Electromechanical games 
Nintendo has licensed several electromechanical games for use in arcades and casinos, including two popular pinball machines by Gottlieb. Super Mario Bros., released on April 25, 1992, was the first Gottlieb machine that included a dot-matrix display tracking scores and various animations. The game shared a lot of its art assets with Super Mario World released for SNES two years prior, and featured Charles Martinet in his first voice-over role as Mario, for which he was never paid nor credited. 4,200 units were manufactured. Super Mario Bros. Mushroom World released a few months later in June 1992, this time based on Super Mario Bros. 3 for NES. Only 519 units were produced, making it significantly rarer and more sought-after by modern collectors.

Other electromechanical games licensed by Nintendo include a Mario Kart 64 slot machine made by Maygay, as well as a series of Mario Fushigi medal games made by Capcom. The Mario Fushigi series began in 2003 with Super Mario Fushigi no Janjan Land, then Super Mario Fushigi no Korokoro Party in 2004, Super Mario Fushigi no Korokoro Party 2 in 2005, and Mario Party Fushigi no Korokoro Catcher (based on Mario Party 8) in 2009.

Merchandise 

Mario has appeared on lunch boxes, T-shirts, magazines, commercials (notably, in a Got Milk? commercial), in candy form, on shampoo bottles, and as plush toys. Multiple Mario-themed versions of popular board and card games have been released by USAopoly, including Monopoly, TacDex, and Connect 4. Nintendo has also released in 2017 a puzzle featuring Mario.

Events 
National Mario Day is an annual holiday to commemorate the Nintendo video game character Mario, on March 10. This date is chosen because  looks like the name MARIO. Gamers can commemorate the occasion by playing games from the series, or with Mario-themed events, and coordinating on social media with the hashtag #NationalMarioDay.

In 2014 the Christian Science Monitor advised parents that Mario Day was an opportunity to bond with their children, and listed Mario Day-themed events parents could take their children to, to encourage that bonding. In 2016, Nintendo created a video about the event, where Mario caused chaos in their American offices; and "brought some joy to the monotonous workday in the ways only Mario could." Chad Concelmo of Destructoid appears in the video.

In March 2013, Nintendo began the Year of Luigi. This included a year of Luigi-themed games like Dr. Luigi, Mario & Luigi Dream Team and New Super Luigi U. A Luigi's Mansion statue was released on Club Nintendo. On March 19, 2014, the Year of Luigi ended.

In September 2020, Nintendo started the Super Mario Bros. 35th Anniversary event, which lasted from September 3, 2020 to March 31, 2021. This event began with a Nintendo Direct which announced many games, as well as covering already released Mario themed merchandise, clothing and in game events.

Theme parks 

Super Nintendo World is a themed area within Universal Studios Japan and Universal Studios Hollywood, is under construction for Universal's Epic Universe, and in development for Universal Studios Singapore. The iterations of this area and its attractions are immersively themed to the Super Mario franchise, as well as the Yoshi's Island and Donkey Kong Country spin-off series.

Music 
The Super Mario series of video games has a large amount of music, much of it composed by Koji Kondo. The "Super Mario Bros. theme" is particularly well-known.

The Super Mario Bros. theme has been featured in many concerts, including "PLAY! Chicago", the Columbus Symphony Orchestra, the Mario & Zelda Big Band Live, Play! A Video Game Symphony, and others.

The Video Games Live concert featured the theme performed by Koji Kondo.

See also
 List of unofficial Mario media

Notes

References 

Non-video game media
Mario
Mario, Non-video game media featuring